Mette Hardenberg (1569–1629), was a Danish noble and landowner. She was known as an eccentric, and became famous in contemporary Denmark when she believed herself to be possessed by a demon. She was also known for the pilgrimage as a beggar, which she undertook after a vision in a dream.

Biography
She was born to riksråd Erik Hardenberg and in 1589 married noble landowner Preben Gyldenstjerne til Vosborg (d. 1616). Mette Hardenberg became insane in 1597: the insanity was believed to be caused by an obsession of a demon, and she was reportedly freed from it after having undertaken a pilgrimage as a beggar, an act to which she claimed to have been advised to in a dream.

References
 H. Mikkelsen, Ligpræd. ov. M. H., 1631.
 Schønau, Danske lærde Fruentimer S. 794 ff.
 Nye Danske Mag. II, 318 ff.
Dansk biografisk Lexikon / VII. Bind. I. Hansen - Holmsted

16th-century Danish people
1629 deaths
Demons in Christianity
1569 births
17th-century Danish women landowners
17th-century Danish landowners